Deanwood is a neighborhood in Northeast Washington, D.C., bounded by Eastern Avenue to the northeast, Kenilworth Avenue to the northwest, Division Avenue to the southeast, and Nannie Helen Burroughs Avenue to the south.

One of Northeast's oldest neighborhoods, Deanwood's relatively low-density, small wood-frame and brick homes, and dense tree cover give it a small-town character that is unique in the District of Columbia. Much of its housing stock dates from the early 20th century. Several well-known African-American architects, including William Sidney Pittman and Howard D. Woodson, and many skilled local craftsmen designed and built many of its homes. The neighborhood was once home to Nannie Helen Burroughs, an early civil rights leader and the founder of the National Training School for Women and Girls, an independent boarding school for African-American girls founded in 1909 and located on 50th Street, NE. Marvin Gaye (1939–1984) was also born and raised in this neighborhood. From 1921 to 1940, Deanwood was also home to Suburban Gardens (50th and Hayes NE), a black-owned amusement park that served thousands of African-American residents during a time of racial segregation.

It is served by the Deanwood Metro station on the Orange Line.

The neighborhood is featured prominently in crime author Jim Beane's short story "Jeanette."

Schools
 Integrated Design Electronics Academy
 The Monroe School
 Houston Elementary School
 Aiton Elementary School
 The Fishing School
 H.D. Woodson Senior High School

Churches
 Beulah Baptist Church, of Deanwood Heights, DC

Libraries
 Deanwood Neighborhood Library

Public transportation
Metro stations
 Deanwood
 Benning Road
 Minnesota Avenue

Major bus routes
 X-2 Minnesota Avenue to Lafayette Square
 X-9 Express Capitol Heights to Metro Center
 W-4 Deanwood to Anacostia

External links
 Three Things About Deanwood

References

Neighborhoods in Northeast (Washington, D.C.)